Abandoned is a 2022 horror film directed by Spencer Squire and written by Erik Patterson and Jessica Scott. The film stars Emma Roberts, John Gallagher Jr. and Michael Shannon. The film was Squire's feature film directorial debut, with Roberts serving as one of the producers.

The film was released on June 17, 2022, and received negative reviews from critics.

Plot

A young couple, Sara and Alex, arrive at a farmhouse in the countryside with their infant son, Liam. They seem to be shifting away from the city, and the farmhouse instantly seems like the ideal choice. Sara, however, seems to be struggling to manage her incessantly crying baby and is distant at times. Alex makes up for her silence as he looks around the property, which has a big house and barn. As the paperwork is about to be finalized, Sara asks the realtor why the house has not had anyone living in it for a long time, to which she frankly responds that there had been some gruesome incident in it many years back. Alex says that they do not want to know about it, but Sara insists that they should, and the realtor reveals that a girl had committed suicide in the house after killing her baby and father. She hands them an enveloped report and suspects that the couple will also obviously skip the property, much like everyone else before them. But Sara says that they still want to take it and even tells her husband that she would not mind a little haunting.

Sara most struggles to be close to her son, who also seems to not want to be breastfed and instead prefers milk from a bottle. Alex, a veterinarian, often works long days, leaving Sara alone with Liam. She and Alex find a locked room in their new house, which they open and to find a child’s room, presumably the girl’s. As they are exploring, a man arrives and scares them. He says his name is Renner, and he lives next door. He is helpful, fixing things around the house for Sara and telling her what really happened in there. Sara also opens the envelope and reads up about the incident: a young girl, Anna, used to live with her father, Robert, in the house, who she murdered along with her own infant baby, before killing herself some forty years back. 

Sara begins to hear and see things in the house. It is revealed that she is suffering from postpartum depression, which leaves her feeling distant from her husband and baby. She hears children laughing and playing behind a locked door that has been hidden by a heavy wardrobe. Renner tells Sara that Anna had a brother, their mother had died in childbirth, and that Robert had been raping Anna. When Sara asks what happened to the brother, Renner says he was ignored and blamed for his mother’s death. Sara reveals to him that she’s seen both Anna and Robert in the house; Renner says he doesn’t believe in such things and leaves. Sara invites the realtor over to ask what happened to the boy, and the realtor tells her it is Renner; he had tried to assume a new identity when he returned. 

Things begin to disappear in the house —- Liam’s pacifier and toy truck and Sara and Alex’s wedding portrait. He passively accuses her of misplacing them. One night while she is up with Liam, Sara sees Anna lying on a bed with Robert over her, both staring at Sara. She puts Liam down on the floor to investigate. As she is distracted by this, Liam nearly crawls down the stairs. He is saved by Alex. The next morning, Alex tells her he’s called a psychiatrist and will not leave her alone with Liam for the time being. She tries to tell him that there’s a presence in the house, but he remains logical. The psychiatrist arrives and Alex leaves for work. She lies to him when he asks if she’s been hearing or seeing things. He wants her to begin taking medication, but she refuses. Sara tells him she feels none of the euphoria of motherhood, which causes her to feel embarrassed and guilty. She’s afraid if she takes the medication, she’ll never feel a real connection to Liam. She asks him to leave, but he tells her he can’t. Renner arrives and tells the psychiatrist he can go. He leaves the pills on the table should she decide to take them. 

While Alex is working, Renner stays with Sara and plays with Liam. She asks why he didn’t tell her he was Anna’s brother. He said he didn’t want anyone to know and had just wanted to live close to his home. He cries, and the two share a tender moment. Sara asks if there were other babies before the one Anna killed, and he reveals there were three; he becomes visibly upset and tells her not to bother the wardrobe, that there’s a reason it was placed in front of that door, and a reason only Robert could move it. 

Sara pretends to take the pills for Alex’s sake. One night while the three are taking a bath, Alex receives a phone call and has to leave Sara alone with Liam. She hears stomping in the hallway, and Robert appears, holding her underwater. She resurfaces and he’s disappeared. Standing watch over Liam’s crib, she hears Anna screaming, presumably in labor, and hears Robert in the hall. She then hears Alex calling to her, thinking he’s returned home, and goes downstairs, leaving Liam in his crib. She hears Liam cry, runs back upstairs, and finds the room behind the wardrobe has been opened. All of their missing things are inside. Two dirty boys emerge from the wall, one of them holding Liam. She pleads with them to return the baby, but they accuse her of intentionally hurting her son. One of them raises a hatchet and swings as Sara screams and the screen fades to black. 

It is morning, and Sara is holding Liam, repeating happily that he is hers. Alex comes home to his family at the table, breakfast waiting. He sits, and Sara assures him that it’s over. After, Liam is growing and they seem happy. Renner teaches Liam to play baseball, and Alex, Sara, and Liam are later seen on a swing with their arms around each other. With her other arm, Sara cradles her pregnant belly.

Cast
 Emma Roberts as Sara Davis
 John Gallagher Jr. as Alex Davis
 Michael Shannon as Chris Renner
 Paul Schneider as Dr. Carver
 Kate Arrington as Cindy
 Paul Dillion as Harrington
 Marie May as Infant Liam
 Addy Miller as Anna Solomon
 Justin Matthew Smith as Robert Solomon
Deven Malbrock

Release
The film was released on June 17, 2022, by Vertical Entertainment.

Production

Filming
The film was filmed around North Carolina in Piedmont region. The principal photography took place around September and October 2021.

Reception

Box office
Abandoned was released from 54 theaters in United States and it grossed $21,149 on the first day, $59,761 in three days, and $96,761 in one week.

Critical response

Alexander Harrison from Screen Rant rated the film 2 out of 5 stars and wrote: "Abandoned has a few things in its favor, but a disappointing conclusion obscures them while making the movie's flaws even more prominent."

References

External links

Films shot in North Carolina
Films set on farms
American haunted house films
2022 horror films
2020s English-language films
2020s supernatural horror films
American supernatural horror films
2022 directorial debut films
Vertical Entertainment films
2020s American films